In 2010, the French government's  (the department in charge of regulating competition) fined eleven banks €384.9 million for colluding to charge unjustified fees for check processing, especially for extra fees charged during the transition from paper check transfer to "Exchanges Check-Image" electronic transfer.

The banks were:

BPCE

BNP Paribas

 (CIC)
HSBC
LCL

See also
Cheque fraud
Cheque truncation
Substitute check
Check 21

Notes 

 

Controversies in France
2010 in France
2010 in economics
Economic history of France